Obafemi Oluwole Onashile (born August 1964) is a Nigerian quantity surveyor, the founding partner of Nigeria's largest quantity surveying firm Consol Associates located in Nigeria, Ghana and Rwanda. He is the past President of the Nigerian Institute of Quantity Surveyors (NIQS). He is the President of the African Institute of Quantity Surveyors.

Background
Obafemi was born at Jericho Nursing Home, Ibadan, Oyo State, Nigeria to a very influential and wealthy family that hails from Ogun State, southwest Nigeria. He grew up in Oke Ado, Ibadan, Oyo State, Nigeria. His father, Folarin Onashile, was a famous well read lawyer, one of the first of the profession to be trained in the United Kingdom, he rose to be the chief judge of Ogun State High Court and his mother, Esther Olayide Onashile, was a business woman and building contractor. He was the seventh child in his family of nine children.

Education
Obafemi had his primary education at Ebenezer Church Primary School, Oke Ado, Ibadan, Oyo State, Nigeria in 1975. In 1980, he completed his secondary education at Federal Government College Odogbolu and he had his bachelor's degree in Quantity Surveying at the Obafemi Awolowo University, Ile Ife in 1986. He then went on to obtain a master's degree in Project Management at the University of Lagos in 2007.

Career
In 1980, Onashile started his career during his National Youth Service Corps at the Ministry of Works, Housing and Transport, Minna, Niger State. His professional training started at Tillyards & Partners, Kaduna in 1987. He then joined Group Q Associates, Lagos in 1988 there he worked till 1992. In November 2017, Onashile became the President of Nigerian Institute of Quantity Surveyors (NIQS) until 2019 when he handed over to Mohammed Abba Tor. He is currently the President of the African Association of Quantity Surveyors  (AAQS) the umbrella body of all the institutions of Quantity Surveyors in Africa Onashile started Consol Associates as a Principal Partner after leaving Group Q Associates, Lagos. He leads the management of the Lagos office.

References 

1966 births
Living people
Quantity surveyors